NASCAR on SportsChannel America relates to NASCAR's Busch Grand National (now the Xfinity Series) races broadcast on the now defunct SportsChannel America television network.  SportsChannel America's coverage began in 1990. For instance, SportsChannel America broadcast the Roses Stores 200 and the Chevy Dealers of New England 250.

Commentators
Rick Benjamin – Benjamin used the pseudonym Ron Williams, because his family unapproved of him revealing his real name.
Ron Bouchard
Mike Hogewood
Glenn Jarrett
Mike Joy
Ralph Sheheen
Bob Varsha

See also
Xfinity Series#United States

References

External links
Google Search - Timeline

SportsChannel
1990 American television series debuts
NASCAR Xfinity Series
SportsChannel America